Daniel Dean Bruce (May 18, 1950 – March 1, 1969) was a United States Marine who posthumously received the Medal of Honor for heroism in Vietnam. 

Bruce joined the Marines in 1968, and was deployed to Vietnam in January 1969. Two months later, on March 1, 1969, Bruce was on night watch at Firebase Tomahawk in Quang Ngai Province when an enemy explosive charge was thrown at his position. The private first class caught it, held it close to his body, and ran from his position, where the grenade exploded and killed Bruce. This action saved the lives of three other Marines.

Biography
Daniel Bruce was born on May 18, 1950, in Michigan City, Indiana, where he attended Garfield Grammar School, Barker Jr. High School, and Elston Sr. High School.

He enlisted in the U.S. Marine Corps Reserve in Chicago, Illinois on May 20, 1968, and was discharged to enlist in the regular Marine Corps on July 17, 1968.

Upon completion of recruit training with the 2nd Recruit Training Battalion, Recruit Training Regiment, Marine Corps Recruit Depot San Diego, California in September 1968, he was transferred to the Marine Corps Base Camp Pendleton, California. He completed individual combat training with Company U, 3rd Battalion, 2nd Infantry Training Regiment in November, and basic infantry training with Weapons Company, Basic Infantry Training Battalion, 2nd Infantry Training Regiment in December.

On January 1, 1969, Bruce was promoted to private first class, and later that month was ordered to the Republic of Vietnam. He was assigned duty as anti-tank assault man with Headquarters and Service Company, 3rd Battalion, 5th Marines, 1st Marine Division.

While participating in combat at Firebase Tomahawk, Quang Nam Province, on March 1, 1969, he was killed in action — for his gallantry on this occasion, which saved the lives of three fellow Marines, he was awarded the Medal of Honor.  He was on night watch when an enemy explosive was thrown at his position.  He caught the charge, held it to his body, and ran from his position — away from fellow Marines who would have been killed by the explosion.  Seconds later, the charge exploded and the full force of the blast was absorbed by Bruce, killing him instantly.

Decorations

A complete list of his medals and decorations includes: the Medal of Honor, the Purple Heart, the National Defense Service Medal, the Vietnam Service Medal with one bronze star, and the Republic of Vietnam Campaign Medal.

The Wall
Daniel Dean Bruce has his name inscribed on the Vietnam Veterans Memorial on panel 31W, line 099.

See also

List of Medal of Honor recipients
List of Medal of Honor recipients for the Vietnam War

References
Inline

General

1950 births
1969 deaths
United States Marine Corps Medal of Honor recipients
United States Marines
American military personnel killed in the Vietnam War
People from Michigan City, Indiana
People from Indiana in the Vietnam War
Vietnam War recipients of the Medal of Honor
United States Marine Corps personnel of the Vietnam War